The .270 British (or .270 Enfield) is an experimental intermediate rifle cartridge that was developed by the British at the same time as the .280 British as a potential successor to the .303 British cartridge. The rimless cartridge has a base diameter of 11.3 mm (like the Russian 7.62×39mm) and a case length of 46 mm. It was not good at long range, but its slender case had the potential to fire a heavier bullet at a relatively high velocity. It was optimized for shorter ranges, while the .280 favored long-range performance to try to meet U.S. requirements.

The cartridge was not adopted, the British initially focused development on the .270, then ultimately chose the NATO-standard 7.62×51mm cartridge.

References

 

Pistol and rifle cartridges
Experimental cartridges